Mapeta omphephora is a species of snout moth in the genus Mapeta. It was described by Harrison Gray Dyar Jr. in 1914 and is known from Mexico.

References

Moths described in 1914
Pyralinae